Mangai Nature Reserve is a protected area in the Democratic Republic of the Congo. The International Union for Conservation of Nature list the reserve as a protected area with sustainable use of natural resources (category VI).

References 

Protected areas of the Democratic Republic of the Congo
Kwilu Province
Southern Congolian forest–savanna mosaic